Reflec‍tions on the Variations, or , which are found among the four Evangelists, in their different Accounts of the  Fac‍ts is an essay by Conyers Middleton; it was published posthumously in 1752 as a part of his Miscellaneous Works.

The inconsistencies in the Gospels of the New Testament found by Middleton were later listed as 11 in number, by William Newcome.

References

External links
 Google Book Search: The Miscellaneous Works of the late Reverend and Learned Conyers Middleton, D.D. — volume II (full text)

English essays
Philosophy essays
1752 works
18th-century essays
18th-century Christian texts